The Book of the River is a novel by Ian Watson published in 1984.

Plot summary
The Book of the River is a novel in which Yaleen is one of the women who sail in an immense river which cannot be crossed due to the gelatinous Black Current that runs its full length.

Reception
Dave Langford reviewed The Book of the River for White Dwarf #55, and stated that "Not exactly major Watson, but good-humoured and enormously readable."

Reviews
Review by Chris Morgan (1984) in Fantasy Review, August 1984 
Review by K. V. Bailey (1984) in Vector 122 
Review by Baird Searles (1986) in Isaac Asimov's Science Fiction Magazine, July 1986 
Review by Don D'Ammassa (1986) in Science Fiction Chronicle, #86 November 1986

References

1984 British novels
British science fiction novels
Victor Gollancz Ltd books